The 2023 season will be the Carolina Panthers' upcoming 29th in the National Football League, their third under the leadership of general manager Scott Fitterer and their first under new head coach Frank Reich. They will attempt to improve upon their 7-10 record from the previous year and return to the playoffs for the first time since 2017.

Draft

Notes

Staff

Current roster

Preseason
The Panthers' preseason opponents and schedule will be announced in the spring.

Regular season

2023 opponents
Listed below are the Panthers' opponents for 2023. Exact dates and times will be announced in the spring.

References

External links
 

Carolina
Carolina Panthers seasons
Carolina Panthers